Samuel "Sammie" Henson (born January 1, 1971) is a World Champion wrestler, winning a gold medal in freestyle for the USA at the 1998 FILA Wrestling World Championships, held in Tehran, Iran. He was also a silver medalist at the 2000 Summer Olympics in the freestyle 54 kg category, losing to Abdullayev in the finals of that event, held in Sydney, New South Wales, Australia.  At the age of 36, he competed at the 2006 FILA Wrestling World Championships held in Guangzhou, China, earning a bronze medal.  He was named USA Wrestling's Man of the Year in 1998.

He is formerly the head coach at West Virginia University. He was also head coach of the Sunkist Kids Wrestling Club. Henson was born in St. Louis, Missouri. In 2015, Henson was inducted into the National Wrestling Hall of Fame as a Distinguished Member.

High school career
Henson attended Francis Howell High School in St. Charles, Missouri.  There, he was coached by Roger Hodapp (1986–1987), and Judd Hofmann (1988–1989).  Henson and brothers Chuck and Kevin helped lead the Francis Howell Vikings to 4 Missouri State Team Championships in the 1980s. Henson was a member of the 1986 and 1987 State Championship teams.  Individually, he placed fourth in state as a freshman, and was a three time Missouri class 4A State Champion.  In 1989 he was named Missouri 4A High School Wrestler of the year, and was a First Team Asics High School All American.

College career
Henson began his college wrestling career at the University of Missouri, in Columbia, Missouri.  He was coached at MU by Wes Roper.  He chose Missouri because it was close to home, and because he wanted to prove that he could win for his in-state school.  He proved the point by becoming a Big 8 champion, and an All-American in his freshman year, winning fifth place at the 1991 NCAA Wrestling Championships.  He achieved this despite being the seventh seed in the tournament.  Ironically, to win fifth place, he defeated second seeded Donnie Heckel, of Clemson University, (the school where he would eventually finish his college career) by a score of 13-2.  He then transferred to Clemson to wrestle under Coach Gil Sanchez.  He ended his college career as the most successful wrestler in Clemson history, going 71-0 over his last two seasons. He won back to back NCAA titles at 118 pounds in 1993 and 1994.  In 1994, he was also named ACC Wrestler of the Year. He then returned to the University of Missouri to finish his degree, graduating in 1995 with a degree in Park, Recreation and Tourism Management.  He was inducted into Clemson's Hall of Fame in 2000. Henson was one of Clemson's last wrestlers (the program was discontinued in 1995 due to Title IX) and named one of ACC's Top 100 athletes in a conference more known for basketball.

International career

US Open
Although primarily known for his freestyle wrestling, Henson also has Greco-Roman wrestling experience.  He won a gold medal in Greco-Roman at the 1990 US Open, and placed 4th in the event at the 1998 Open.  In freestyle at the US Open, Henson placed 4th in 1995, won silver medals in 1997 and 2004, and won the gold in 1998, 2000, and 2005.

Olympic Trials
Henson was an Olympic qualifier in 1988, won silver at the Olympic Trials in 1992 and 2004, and won the gold in the 2000 Olympic Trials held in Dallas, Texas.  He would go on to win the Silver in Sydney.

International Events

|-
| style="border-style: none none solid solid; background: #f0f0f0" | EVENT
| style="border-style: none none solid solid; background: #f0f0f0" | YEAR
| style="border-style: none none solid solid; background: #f0f0f0" | LOCATION
| style="border-style: none none solid solid; background: #f0f0f0" | MEDAL
|-
| Olympic Games
| 2000
| Sydney, Australia
| Silver
|-
| World Championship
| 1998
| Tehran, Iran
| Gold
|-
| World Championship
| 2006
| Guanzgoua, China
| Bronze
|-
| World Cup
| 1997
| Stillwater, Oklahoma
| Silver
|-
| World Cup
| 1999
| Spokane, Washington
| Silver
|-
| Goodwill Games
| 1998
| New York, New York
| Silver
|-
| Yarigan International
| 2000
| Siberia, Russia
| Gold
|-
| Yarigan International
| 2005
| Siberia, Russia
| Bronze
|-
| Cerro Pelado International
| 2000
| St. Spiritus, Cuba
| Silver
|-
| Cerro Pelado International
| 2003
| St. Spiritus, Cuba
| Gold
|-
| Cerro Pelado International
| 2005
| St. Spiritus, Cuba
| Gold
|-
| Medved International
| 2005
| Minsk, Russia
| Gold
|-
| Clansmen International
| 2001
| British Columbia, Canada
| Gold
|-
| Clansmen International
| 2003
| British Columbia, Canada
| Gold
|-
| Dave Schultz International
| 2003
| Colorado Springs, Colorado
| Gold
|-
| Yasar Dogu International
| 1997
| Ankara, Turkey
| Gold
|-
| Yasar Dogu International
| 1998
| Ankara, Turkey
| Gold
|-
| Yasar Dogu International
| 2001
| Ankara, Turkey
| Gold
|-
| Yasar Dogu International
| 2005
| Ankara, Turkey
| Silver
|-
| Poland International
| 2001
| Warsaw, Poland
| Gold
|-
| Kiev Grand Prix International
| 1998
| Kiev, Ukraine
| Bronze
|-
| Uzbekistan Cup
| 1997
| Tashkent, Uzbekistan
| Silver
|-
| Henri Delglane Challenge International
| 1996
| Nice, France
| Bronze
|-
| New York Athletic Club International
| 2000
| New York, New York
| Gold

Coaching career
Henson has worked at the University of Oklahoma, Penn State University, West Point, Cal Poly San Luis Obispo and the University of Nebraska as an assistant coach.  Henson helped coach Michael Lightner and Byron Tucker to NCAA titles at Oklahoma, and helped coach Nebraska's Paul Donahoe to an NCAA crown in 2007.  In just two years at Penn State, Henson helped Coach Troy Sunderland build up the Nittany Lions program from 35th to 6th nationally, with two top-five recruiting classes.  He was at the University of Missouri as the assistant head coach under Brian Smith and was the head coach of the Sunkist Kids Wrestling Club until 2014.  In May 2014, Henson was appointed head coach of the West Virginia Mountaineers.

See also
List of Pennsylvania State University Olympians

References

 Canoe Canada: USA's Samuel Henson, in red, battles with Azerbaijan's Namig Abdullayev during their 54 kg freestyle wrestling finals at the XXVII Summer Games in Sydney, Saturday, Sept. 30, 2000. Abdullayev won the gold. (Photo)
 Sports Illustrated: Two Russians claim gold to salvage pride
 Cal Poly Website

External links
 Official Website

1971 births
Living people
Wrestlers at the 2000 Summer Olympics
American male sport wrestlers
Olympic silver medalists for the United States in wrestling
Missouri Tigers wrestlers
World Wrestling Championships medalists
Medalists at the 2000 Summer Olympics
Clemson Tigers wrestlers
Oklahoma Sooners wrestling coaches
Penn State Nittany Lions wrestling coaches
Army Black Knights wrestling coaches
Nebraska Cornhuskers wrestling
West Virginia Mountaineers wrestling coaches
Competitors at the 1998 Goodwill Games